Orjuela is a Colombian surname of Basque origins that may refer to
Angie Orjuela (born 1989), Colombian long-distance runner 
Arabelly Orjuela (born 1988), Colombian race walker
Fernando Orjuela (born 1991), Colombian cyclist
Hernán Orjuela (born 1957), Colombian television presenter

See also
 Orejuela

References

Basque-language surnames
Spanish-language surnames